Greece women's national goalball team is the women's national team of Greece.  Goalball is a team sport designed specifically for athletes with a vision impairment.  The team takes part in international competitions.

Paralympic Games

2004 Athens 

The team competed in 2004 Summer Paralympics, from 17 and 28 September 2004, in the Faliro Sports Pavilion Arena, Athens, Greece.  There were twelve men's and eight women's teams.  

The team finished eighth.

Regional championships 

The team competes in the IBSA Europe goalball region. 

In 2005, the European Championships were held in Neerpelt, Belgium.  With ten teams competing, the team finished third. The Turkish Blind Sports Federation hosted the 2007 IBSA Goalball European Championships in Anyalya, Turkey with 11 teams contesting the women's competition. The team finished eighth. Munich, Germany hosted the 2009 European Championships with eleven teams taking part.  The team finished the event in fourth place.

Goal scoring by competition

Competitive history 
The table below contains individual game results for the team in international matches and competitions.

See also 

 Disabled sports 
 Greece at the Paralympics

References

National women's goalball teams
Women's national sports teams of Greece
Goalball in Greece
European national goalball teams